The men's foil was one of ten fencing events on the fencing at the 1996 Summer Olympics programme. It was the twenty-second appearance of the event. The competition was held on 22 July 1996. 45 fencers from 19 nations competed. Nations had been limited to three fencers each since 1928. The event was won by Alessandro Puccini of Italy, the nation's eighth victory in the men's foil (matching France for most all-time). France took the other two medals, with Lionel Plumenail earning silver and Franck Boidin winning the bronze medal match.

Background

This was the 22nd appearance of the event, which has been held at every Summer Olympics except 1908 (when there was a foil display only rather than a medal event). Four of the eight quarterfinalists from 1992 returned: gold medalist Philippe Omnès of France, silver medalist Serhiy Holubytskiy of the Unified Team (now competing for Ukraine), bronze medalist Elvis Gregory of Cuba, and fifth-place finisher Joachim Wendt of Austria. The three world champions since the last Games were Alexander Koch of Germany, Rolando Tucker of Cuba, and Dmitriy Shevchenko of Russia; all were competing in Atlanta.

Kazakhstan, Russia, Ukraine, and Uzbekistan each made their debut in the men's foil. France and the United States each made their 20th appearance, tied for most of any nation; France had missed only the 1904 (with fencers not traveling to St. Louis) and the 1912 (boycotted due to a dispute over rules) foil competitions, while the United States had missed the inaugural 1896 competition and boycotted the 1980 Games altogether.

Competition format

The 1996 tournament vastly simplified the competition format after a horrendously complex system used in the previous Games in Barcelona. Pool play was eliminated. Double elimination was eliminated. The tournament became a simple single-elimination bracket, with a bronze medal match. Bouts were to 15 touches. Standard foil rules regarding target area, striking, and priority were used.

Schedule

All times are Eastern Daylight Time (UTC-4)

Results

Section 1

Section 2

Section 3

Section 4

Finals

Final classification

References

Foil men
Men's events at the 1996 Summer Olympics